Glen Eden is the name of:

Glen Eden, Indiana, an unincorporated community
Glen Eden (ski area) in Milton, Ontario, Canada
Glen Eden, New Zealand is a suburb of West Auckland, New Zealand